Touché, Touche, Latouche, La Touche, or de la Touche may refer to:

Sports
 Touché (fencing), French for "touched", a term used to acknowledge a hit

Arts and entertainment

 Touché (Hush album), by Australian band Hush, 1977
 Touché (Ryan Stout album), by comedian Ryan Stout, 2011
 Touché (band), a German boy band
 "Touché" (song), a 2004 song by Godsmack
 Touché: The Adventures of the Fifth Musketeer, a 1995 video game
 Touché Turtle, a cartoon character

People
 Touche (surname), including a list of people with the name
 DJ Touche, Theo Keating, also known as Fake Blood, British DJ, musician and music producer

Places
 Latouche Island, Gulf of Alaska, United States
 La Touche, Drôme, commune in Drôme, France
 Livré-la-Touche, commune in Mayenne, France

See also
 Touch (disambiguation)
 French ship Latouche-Tréville, several ships
 Haute Touche Zoological Park, Obterre, France
 Latouchella, an extinct genus of marine invertebrate animal
 Latoucheornis or Slaty Bunting, a species of bird
 Touchet
 Touche pas à mon poste !, French talk show